The Zibo–Dongying railway or Zidong railway, also called the Zhangdian–Dongying railway or Zhangdong railway, is a railroad in Shandong Province of northern China, between Zibo and Dongying. The line branches off of the Jiaozhou–Jinan railway at the Zhangdian station near Zibo. Major cities and towns along route include Zibo, Boxing County, and Dongying.

History
From Apr 14th 2016, Zidong railway began upgrading with total investment of 1.1 Billion RMB, and the scheduled completion date is the end of 2017. After this upgrade, the rail speed limit of Zidong railway will upgrade from less than 50 km/h to 120 km/h.  Dongying will be fully connected with Qingdao–Jinan railway within 1 hour, and travel time between Dongying and Jinan will be shortened from 3.5h to 2h.

The electrified railway reopened on 30 September 2018.

Rail Connections
 Zibo: Jiaozhou–Jinan railway

See also

 List of railways in China

References

Railway lines in China
Rail transport in Shandong
Railway lines opened in 1972